Jews and Judaism in China are predominantly composed of Sephardi Jews and their descendants. Other Jewish ethnic divisions are also represented, including Ashkenazi Jews, Mizrahi Jews and a number of converts.

The Jewish Chinese community manifests a wide range of Jewish cultural traditions and it also encompasses the full spectrum of Jewish religious observance. Though a small minority, Chinese Jews have had an open presence in the country since the arrival of the first Jewish immigrants during the 8th century CE. Relatively isolated communities of Jews developed from ancient all the way to modern China, most notably the Kaifeng Jews (the term "Chinese Jews" is often used in a restricted sense in order to refer to these communities).
In the 19th and early 20th centuries, Jewish merchants from around the world began to trade in Chinese ports, particularly in the commercial centres of Hong Kong, which was for a time a British colony; Shanghai (the International Settlement and French Concession); and Harbin (the Trans-Siberian Railway). In the first half of the 20th century, thousands of Jewish refugees escaping from pogroms in the Russian Empire arrived in China. By the time of the establishment of the People's Republic of China in 1949, only a few Jews were known to have maintained the practice of their religion and culture.

Overview
The presence of a community of Jewish immigrants in China arguably began sometime in the Song Dynasty though a number of scholars have argued for their presence there in earlier Tang dynasty times. In the 9th century, the Persian geographer Ibn Khordadbeh noted the travels of Jewish merchants called Radhanites, whose trade took them to China via the Silk Road through Central Asia and India. He mentioned the presence of Jewish merchants in a number of Chinese cities, and the important economic role they played transporting merchandise as well as transmitting scientific and technological expertise by land and sea all the way from Spain and France via the Middle East to China. The medieval Italian explorer Jacob of Ancona, the supposed author of a book of travels, was a scholarly Jewish merchant who wrote in vernacular Italian, and reached China in 1271, although some authors question its veracity.

During the period of China's opening to the West and British quasi-colonialism, the first group to settle in China were Jews who arrived in China under British protection following the First Opium War. Many of these Jews were of Indian or Iraqi origin, due to significant British colonialism in these regions. The second community came in the first decades of the 20th century when many Jews arrived in Hong Kong and Shanghai during those cities' periods of economic expansion. Many more Jews arrived as refugees from the Russian Revolution of 1917. A surge of Jews and Jewish families was to arrive in the late 1930s and 1940s, for the purpose of seeking refuge from the Holocaust in Europe and were predominantly of European origin. Shanghai was notable for its special area assigned to Jewish refugees, most of whom left after the war, the rest relocating prior to or immediately after the establishment of the People's Republic of China.

Many Jews in China converted to Islam and became Hui Muslims.     

Over the centuries, the Kaifeng community came to be virtually indistinguishable from the Hui and Han Chinese population and is therefore no longer recognized by the Chinese government as a separate ethnic minority. This is as a result of having maintained already-Jewish and adopted many Han Chinese customs including patrilineal descent and extensive intermarriage with the Hui population. Since their religious practices are considered to be functionally extinct, they are not eligible for expedited immigration to Israel under the Law of Return unless they explicitly convert.

Today, many descendants of the Jews have assimilated into Hui Muslim populace. Some of them, as well as international Jewish communities are beginning to search for these descendants to help them revive their interest in their Jewish roots. This is especially important in modern China because belonging to any minority group includes a variety of benefits including reduced restrictions on the number of children and easier admission standards to tertiary education.

History
It has been asserted by some that the Jews who have historically resided in various places in China originated with the Lost Ten Tribes of the exiled ancient Kingdom of Israel who relocated to the areas of present-day China. Traces of some ancient Jewish rituals have been observed in some places.

One well-known group was the Kaifeng Jews, who are purported to have traveled from Persia to India during the mid-Han Dynasty and later migrated from the Muslim-inhabited regions of northwestern China (modern day Gansu province) to Henan province during the early Northern Song Dynasty (960–1127).

Origins

There is an oral tradition that the first Jews immigrated to China through Persia following the Roman Emperor Titus's capture of Jerusalem in 70 CE. A large number of Jews emigrated from Persia during the reign of Emperor Ming of Han (58–75 CE). Writing in 1900, Father Joseph Brucker hypothesized that Jews came to China from India by a sea route since ancient times.

Three steles with inscriptions found at Kaifeng bear some historical suggestions. The oldest, dating from 1489, commemorates the construction of a synagogue (1163) (bearing the name Qīngzhēn Sì, a term often used for mosque in Chinese), states the Jews entered China from India in the Later Han Dynasty (25–220 CE), the Jews' 70 Chinese surnames, their audience with an "un-named" Song Dynasty Emperor, and finally lists the transmission of their religion from Abraham down to the prophet Ezra. The second tablet, dated 1512 (found in the synagogue Xuanzhang Daojing Si) details the Jews' religious practices. The third is dated 1663 and commemorates the re-rebuilding of the Qingzhen si synagogue and recaps the information from the other two steles.

Father Joseph Brucker believed Matteo Ricci's manuscripts indicate there were only approximately ten or twelve Jewish families in Kaifeng in the late 16th and early 17th century, and that they had reportedly resided there for five or six hundred years. It was also stated in the manuscripts that there was a greater number of Jews in Hangzhou. This could be taken to suggest that loyal Jews fled south along with the soon-to-be crowned Emperor Gaozong to Hangzhou. In fact, the 1489 stele mentions how the Jews "abandoned Bianliang" (Kaifeng) after the Jingkang Incident.

Many Jewish communities were established in China in the Middle Ages. However, not all left evidence of their existence. The following are those known today: Kaifeng, Hangzhou, Ningbo, Yangzhou, Ningxia, Guangzhou, Beijing, Quanzhou, Nanjing, Xi'an and Luoyang.

Names
The contemporary term for Jews in use among Chinese today is Youtairen in Mandarin Chinese and "yau tai yan" in Cantonese. The terms have a similar pronunciation to יהודאי (Yehudai)—the Aramaic word for Jew—and to Ἰουδαῖος (iudaios), the Greek word.

It has been recorded that the Chinese historically called the Jews Tiao jin jiao (挑筋教), loosely, "the religion which removes the sinew," probably referring to the Jewish dietary prohibition against eating the sciatic nerve (from Genesis 32:32).

Jewish dietary law (kashrut), which forbids the eating of, among other foods, non-ruminant mammals, shellfish and reptiles, would have most likely caused Jewish communities to stand out from the surrounding mainstream Chinese population, as Chinese culture is typically very free in the range of items it deems suitable for food.

Jews have also been called the Blue-Hat Hui, in contrast to other populations of Hui people, who have identified with hats of other colors. The distinction between Muslim and Jewish Hui is not, and historically has not been, well recognised by the dominant Han population.

A modern translation of the "Kaifeng Steles" has shown the Jews referred to their synagogue as "The Pure and Truth", which is essentially the same as the term used in modern China to refer to Muslim mosques (清真寺). lǐbàisì 禮拜寺 and qīngzhēnsì 清真寺 were used as names of both synagogues and mosques by Jews and Muslims.

According to an oral tradition dictated by Xu Xin, Director of the Centre for Judaic Studies at Nanjing University, in his book Legends of the Chinese Jews of Kaifeng, the Kaifeng Jews called Judaism Yīcìlèyè jiào (一賜樂業教), lit. the religion of Israel. Yīcìlèyè is a transliteration and partial translation of "Israel". Xu Xin translates this phrase as "Chosen people, endowed by God, and contented with their lives and work".

Early record

The earliest evidence showing the presence of Jews in China is from the beginning of the 8th century: a business letter written in the Judeo-Persian language, discovered by Marc Aurel Stein. The letter (now housed in the British Museum) was found in Dandan Uiliq, an important post along the Silk Road in northwest China during the Tang Dynasty (618–907). The text is thirty-seven lines in length and was written on paper, a product then manufactured only in China. It was identified, by David Samuel Margoliouth, as dating from 718 CE. Ibn Zeyd al Hassan of Siraf, a 9th-century Arabian traveler, reports that in 878 followers of the Chinese rebel leader Huang Chao besieged Canton (Guangzhou) and killed a large number of foreign merchants, Arabs, Persians, Christians and Jews, resident there.

China was a destination for Radhanite Jews who brought boys, female slaves from Europe to sell to any local according to the Book of Roads and Kingdoms by ibn Khordadbeh. At Dandan Oilik an 8th-century document written in Judeo-Persian was found and translated by Aurel Stein.

Sources indicate that Jews in China were often mistaken for Muslims by other Chinese. The first plausible recorded written Chinese mention of Jews uses the term Zhuhu (竹忽) or Zhuhudu (朱乎得) (perhaps from Arabic Yehoud or from Hebrew Yehudim, "Jews") found in the Annals of the Yuan Dynasty in 1329 and 1354. The text spoke of the reinforcement of a tax levied on "dissenters" and of a government decree that the Jews come en-masse to Beijing, the capital.

Famous Venetian traveler Marco Polo, who visited China, then under the Yuan Dynasty, in the late 13th century, described the prominence of Jewish traders in Beijing. Similar references can be found in the notes of the Franciscan John of Montecorvino, first archbishop of the Roman Catholic Archdiocese of Beijing in the early 14th century, and the writings of Ibn Batuta, an Arabian envoy to the Mongol Empire in the middle of the 14th century.

Genghis Khan called both Jews and Muslims Huihui when he forbade Jews and Muslims from practicing kosher and halal preparation of their food, calling both of them "slaves" and forcing them to eat Mongol food, and banned them from practicing circumcision.

Among all the [subject] alien peoples only the Hui-hui say “we do not eat Mongol food”. [Cinggis Qa’an replied:] “By the aid of heaven we have pacified you; you are our slaves. Yet you do not eat our food or drink. How can this be right?” He thereupon made them eat. “If you slaughter sheep, you will be considered guilty of a crime.” He issued a regulation to that effect ... [In 1279/1280 under Qubilai] all the Muslims say: “if someone else slaughters [the animal] we do not eat”. Because the poor people are upset by this, from now on, Musuluman [Muslim] Huihui and Zhuhu [Jewish] Huihui, no matter who kills [the animal] will eat [it] and must cease slaughtering sheep themselves, and cease the rite of circumcision.

During the Ming Dynasty (1368–1644), a Ming emperor conferred seven surnames upon the Jews, by which they are identifiable today: Ai (艾), Shi (石), Gao (高), Jin (金), Li (李), Zhang (張), and Zhao (趙).
Two of these, Jin and Shi, are the equivalent of common Jewish names in the west: Gold and Stone.

The first modern Western record of Jews residing in China is found in the records of the 17th-century Jesuit missionaries in Beijing. The prominent Jesuit Matteo Ricci, received a visit from a young Jewish Chinese man in 1605. Ricci mentioned this man's name as Ngai, who has since been identified by the French sinologist Paul Pelliot as a Jew named Ai T'ien, who explained that the community he belonged to was monotheistic, or believing in only one God. It is recorded that when he saw a Christian image of Mary with the child Jesus, he took it to be a picture of Rebecca with Esau or Jacob, figures from Hebrew Scripture. Ngai (Ai Tian, Ai T'ien) declared that he had come from Kaifeng, and stated that this was the site of a large Jewish population. Ricci sent an ethnic Chinese Jesuit Lay Brother to visit Kaifeng; later, other Jesuits (mostly European) also visited the city. It was later discovered that the Jewish community had a synagogue (Libai si), which was constructed facing the west, and housed a number of written materials and books.

The Jews who managed the synagogue were called "Mullahs". Floods and fire repeatedly destroyed the books of the Kaifeng synagogue. They obtained some from Ningxia and Ningbo to replace them. Another Hebrew roll of law was bought from a Muslim in Ning-keang-chow in Shen-se (Shanxi), who acquired it from a dying Jew at Canton.

The Chinese called Muslims, Jews, and Christians in ancient times by the same name, "Hui Hui" (Hwuy-hwuy). Crossworshipers (Christians) were called the "Huay who abstain from animals without the cloven foot", Muslims were called "Hwuy who abstain from pork", Jews were called "Hwuy who extract the sinews (removes the sciatic nerve)". Hwuy-tsze (Hui zi) or Hwuy-hwuy (Hui Hui) is presently used almost exclusively for Muslims, but Jews were still called Lan Maou Hwuy tsze (Lan mao Hui zi) which means "Blue cap Hui zi". At Kaifeng, Jews were called "Teaou kin keaou "extract sinew religion". Jews and Muslims in China shared the same name for synagogue and mosque, which were both called "Tsing-chin sze" (Qingzhen si) "Temple of Purity and Truth", the name dated to the 13th century. The synagogue and mosques were also known as Le-pae sze (Libai si). A tablet indicated that Judaism was once known as "Yih-tsze-lo-nee-keaou" (israelitish religion) and synagogues known as Yih-tsze lo nee leen (Israelitish Temple), but it faded out of use.

A Muslim in Nanjing told Semedo that four families of Jews converted to Islam since they were the last Jews in Nanjing, their numbers diminishing.

Various Jewish Chinese individuals worked in government service and owned big properties in China in the 17th century.

Shanghai's first wave of Jews came in the second half of the 19th century, many being Mizrahi Jews from Iraq. The first Jew who arrived there was Elias David Sassoon, who, about the year 1850, opened a branch in connection with his father's Bombay house. Since that period Jews gradually migrated from India to Shanghai, most of them being engaged from Bombay as clerks by the firm of David Sassoon & Co. The community was composed mainly of "Asian," (Sephardi) German, and Russian Jews, though there were a few of Austrian, French, and Italian origin among them. Jews took a considerable part in developing trade in China, and several served on the municipal councils, among them being Silas Aaron Hardoon, partner in the firm of E. D. Sassoon & Co., who served on the French and English councils at the same time. During the early days of Jewish settlement in Shanghai, Jews were involved in the trade in opium and Bombay cotton yarn.

Modern times

Contemporaneous sources estimated the Jewish population in China in 1940—including Manchukuo—at 36,000 (source: Catholic Encyclopedia).

In the 19th and early 20th centuries, Jewish merchants from around the world began to trade in Chinese ports, particularly in the commercial centres of Hong Kong, which was for a time a British colony; Shanghai (the International Settlement and French Concession); and Harbin (the Trans-Siberian Railway). In the first half of the 20th century, thousands of Jewish refugees escaping from pogroms in the Russian Empire arrived in China. By the time of the establishment of the People's Republic of China in 1949, only a few Jews were known to have maintained the practice of their religion and culture. China's Jewish communities have been ethnically diverse, ranging from the Jews of Kaifeng and all other ports throughout China. Kaifeng Jewish ancestry has been found among their descendants living among the Hui Muslims, such as during a hajj pilgrimage the Hui Muslim woman Jin Xiaojing (金效靜) found out about her Jewish ancestry and wrote about it in an article, "China's Jews" (中国的犹太人) published in "Points East" in 1981. Scholars have pointed out that Hui Muslims may have absorbed Kaifeng Jews instead of Han Confucians and Buddhists. Jewish converts to Islam who became Hui Muslims in 16th century China were called the blue hat Hui (藍帽回回) since they converted to Islam due to similarities in their traditions. One of the 7 prominent Hui Muslim clans of Kaifeng, the Zhang Jewish clan, became Muslim. The Zhang family, among several Hui Muslims with Kaifeng Jewish ancestry call themselves "fake Muslims" since they are openly proud of their ancestry Instead of being absorbed into Han, a portion of the Jews of China of Kaifeng became Hui Muslims. In 1948 Samuel Stupa Shih (Shi Hong Mo) (施洪模) said he saw a Hebrew language "Religion of Israel" Jewish inscription on a tombstone in a Qing dynasty Muslim cemetery to a place west of Hangzhou. It is reported that they came to be more or less totally assimilated into the Hui Muslim populace, due to widespread intermarriage; especially during the Ming Dynasty. In the late 20th and early 21st centuries, however, some international Jewish groups, most notably Shavei Israel, have helped Chinese Jews rediscover their Jewish heritage and reconnect with their Jewish roots.

Shanghai 
Jewish life in Shanghai had really taken off with the arrival of the British. Mizrahi Jews from the Middle East came as traders via India and Hong Kong and established some of the leading trading companies in the second half of the 19th century. Later, after World War I, many Ashkenazi Jews came from Europe. Rebbe Meir Ashkenazi (Chabad-Lubavitch) was the Chief Rabbi of Shanghai (1926–1949).

Russian Jews 
At the early 20th century many Russian Jews fleeing pogroms in several towns in Russian Empire decided to move to northeast China for permanent settlement (Rabbi Aharon Moshe Kiselev served in Harbin from 1913 until his death in 1949). After the Russian Revolution of 1917, many White Russians, fled to Harbin (former Manchuria). These included, among others, Dr. Abraham Kaufman, who played a leading role in the Harbin Jewish community after 1919, the parents of future Israeli Prime Minister Ehud Olmert, and Teodor Parnicki at the age of 12. According to estimates, over 20,000 Jews lived in Harbin and played a key role in the shaping of local politics, economy and international trade.

Dr. Sun Yat-sen, founder of the Republic of China, admired the Jewish people and Zionism, and he also saw parallels between the persecution of Jews and the domination of China by the Western powers. He stated, "Though their country was destroyed, the Jewish nation has existed to this day ... [Zionism] is one of the greatest movements of the present time. All lovers of democracy cannot help but support wholeheartedly and welcome with enthusiasm the movement to restore your wonderful and historic nation, which has contributed so much to the civilization of the world and which rightfully deserve [sic] an honorable place in the family of nations."

The Japanese occupation of Northeast China in 1931 and the establishment of Manchukuo in 1932 had a negative impact on the Harbin Jewish community (13,000 in 1929). Most of those Jews left Harbin for Tianjin, Shanghai, and the British Mandate of Palestine. Until 1939, the Russian Jews were about 5,000 in Shanghai.

World War II
 
Another wave of 18,000 Jews from Germany, Austria, and Poland immigrated to Shanghai in the late 1930s and early 1940s to escape the Holocaust. Shanghai was an open city at the time and it did not have restrictions on immigration, and some Chinese diplomats such as Ho Feng Shan issued "protective" passports and the Japanese diplomat Chiune Sugihara issued transit visas with which refugees could go to Shanghai after a short stay in Japan. The total number of Jews who entered Shanghai during this period equaled the total number of Jews who fled to Australia, Canada, India, New Zealand and South Africa combined. Many of the Jews in China later moved to found the modern state of Israel.

Shanghai was an important safe-haven for Jewish refugees during the Holocaust, since it was one of the few places in the world where one didn't need a visa. However, it was not easy to get there. The Japanese, who controlled the city, preferred to look the other way. However, some corrupt officials also exploited the plight of the Jews. By 1941, nearly 20,000 European Jews had found shelter there.

Notable Jews during the Second Sino-Japanese War include Dr. Jakob Rosenfeld, Stanisław Flato, Ruth Weiss, Eva Sandberg (photographer and wife of Communist leader Xiao San), and Morris Abraham Cohen.

Late in the war, Nazi representatives pressured the Japanese army to devise a plan to exterminate Shanghai's Jewish population, and this pressure eventually became known to the Jewish community's leadership. However, the Japanese had no intention of further provoking the anger of the Allies after their already notorious invasion of China and their additional invasion of a number of other Asian nations, so they delayed the German request until the War ended. With the intercession of the Amshenower Rebbe and the translation skills of Leo (Ariyeh) Hanin, the Japanese ultimately kept the Jews of Shanghai safe.

In general, in the period from 1845 to 1945, more than 40,000 Jews came to China to do business or in search of a safe haven.

Late 20th century
After World War II and the establishment of the PRC in 1949, most of these Jews emigrated to Israel or the West, although a few remained. Three prominent non-Chinese lived in China from the establishment of the People's Republic of China to the contemporary period: Sidney Shapiro, Israel Epstein, and Ruth Weiss, two American emigres and one Austrian emigre, are of Jewish descent. Another Jewish-American, Sidney Rittenberg served as interpreter to many top Chinese officials.

Structured Jewish life returned to Beijing in 1979 with the founding of Kehillat Beijing, an egalitarian lay-led community serving ex-patriate Jews from all over the world.

Sara Imas, the Shanghai-born daughter of Shanghai's Jewish Club president, Leiwi Imas, became the first Chinese Jewish immigrant to Israel after the two countries established formal diplomatic relations in 1992. Leiwi Imas, who had to leave Germany for Poland in 1939, arrived in Shanghai the same year. He spent his final years in Shanghai until 1962, prior to the beginning of the Cultural Revolution. Although Sara Imas's non-Chinese appearance and family background brought her much trouble during the Cultural Revolution when she was accused of being a foreign capitalist and spy, today Sara Imas has returned to Shanghai, working as the Chinese representative of an Israeli diamond company.

On June 27, 1985, an international group of scholars and activists gathered in Palo Alto, California to establish the Sino-Judaic Institute. Rabbi Anson Laytner serves as the incumbent president.

The Institute of Jewish Studies was established at Nanjing University in 1992.

Since the 1990s, the Shanghai municipal government has taken the initiative to preserve historical Western architectures that were constructed during Shanghai's colonial past. Many formerly Jewish-owned hotels and private residence have been included in the preservation project. In 1997, the Kadoorie-residence-turned Shanghai Children's Palace, had their spacious front garden largely removed in order to make room for the city's overpass system under construction. A One Day Tour of the history of Jewish presence in Shanghai can be arranged through the Center of Jewish Studies Shanghai. Rabbi Shalom Greenberg from Chabad-Lubavitch in New York City arrived in Shanghai to serve this community in August 1998. Rabbi Arthur Schneier, president of the Appeal of Conscience Foundation of New York, donated a Torah to the community that same year. On the first day of Rosh Hashanah, in September 1999, a Jewish New Year service was held at the Ohel Rachel Synagogue for the first time since 1952.

21st century
As of 2010, it is estimated that 2,000 to 3,000 Jews lived in Shanghai. In May 2010, the Ohel Rachel Synagogue in Shanghai was temporarily reopened to the local Jewish community for weekend services. Synagogues are found in Beijing, Shanghai and Hong Kong, serving both native Chinese Jews, Israelis and diaspora Jewish communities across the world.

In 2001, Rabbi Shimon Freundlich from the Chabad-Lubavitch movement came and settled in Beijing with the mission of building and leading the Chabad-Lubavitch Centre of Beijing. Kehillat Beijing continues its practice of conducting weekly lay-led Shabbat services, regular holiday observance, and community activities including retreats and celebrations. In 2007, the Sephardic community of Shanghai opened a synagogue, study hall, kosher kitchen, and educational classes for children and adults. The community has its own hacham, who functions as a teacher and chazan, in addition to Rabbi Ephraim Bezalel, who manages local community affairs and kashrut needs. Since a significant amount of Chinese food products and food ingredients are exported to the American market, a number of kosher certification agencies send rabbis to China to serve as kosher inspectors (mashgichim). As of 2009, over 50 mashgichim have been stationed in China, 7 of them from the Orthodox Union.

As of 2019, Harbin could claim a single Jewish inhabitant, professor Dan Ben-Canaan, who helped advise the local government on restoring the city's synagogues and other Jewish-related buildings.

Kaifeng's Jewish community has reported increasing suppression by the authorities since 2015, reversing the modest revival it experienced in the 1990s. The observance of public religious services and the celebration of religious festivals like Passover and Sukkot have been prohibited, and Jewish community groups have been shut down. Signs have been removed from the Kaifeng Synagogue, a historical site located on Teaching the Torah Lane that is now under strict surveillance.

A small number of Chinese Jews have succeeded in making aliyah and immigrating to Israel with the help of private organisations such as Shavei Israel.

Notable Chinese-born people of Jewish ancestry
Song Dandan, an actress who often appears in the Chinese New Year's Gala on CCTV
Stanley Ho, founder and Chairman of SJM Holdings which owns nineteen casinos in Macau including the Grand Lisboa, nicknamed variously Godfather and King of Gambling, reflecting the government-granted monopoly he held on the Macau gambling industry for 75 years
Josie Ho, Stanley Ho's daughter, who has a Dutch Jewish bloodline. Hong Kong-based actress.
Sun Zhenni, a member of SNH48
Laurence Tribe, an American professor of constitutional law born to European Jewish parents
Ron Klinger, an Australian leading English-language bridge writer, born in Shanghai to European Jewish parents
Mike Medavoy, an American film producer of Ukrainian Jewish descent
Zhao Yingcheng, a Ming Dynasty official from the 17th century, member of the Kaifeng Jewish community
Sir Michael David Kadoorie, a Hong Kong billionaire businessman, and the chairman and 18% owner of CLP Group

See also

Antisemitism in China
Chinese people in Israel
History of the Jews in Hong Kong
History of the Jews in Taiwan
Kaifeng Jews
Ten Lost Tribes
People's Republic of China–Israel relations
Religion in China
Freedom of religion in China
Shanghai Ghetto

References

Citations

Sources 
 Works cited

 
 

 General references

Further reading
 Adler, Marcus N. "Chinese Jews." The Jewish Quarterly Review 13.1 (1900): 18-41. online
 Eber, Irene, and Kathryn Hellerstein, eds. Jews in China: Cultural Conversations, Changing Perceptions (2021) excerpt
 Ehrlich, M. Avrum. Jews and Judaism in modern China (Routledge, 2009).
 Finn, James. The Jews in China: Their Synagogue, Their Scriptures, Their History (1843) very old guide online.
 Katz, Yossi. "The Jews of China and their Contribution to the Establishment of the Jewish National Home in Palestine in the First Half of the Twentieth Century." Middle Eastern Studies 46.4 (2010): 543-554.
 Kaufman, Jonathan. The Last Kings of Shanghai: The Rival Jewish Dynasties That Helped Create Modern China (2021) excerpt
 Laytner, Anson, and Jordan Paper, The Chinese Jews of Kaifeng: A Millennium of Adaptation and Endurance (Lexington Books, 2017).
 
 Loewenthal, Rudolf. "The nomenclature of Jews in China." Monumenta Serica 12.1 (1947): 97-126.
 Malek, Roman. From Kaifeng to Shanghai: Jews in China (Routledge, 2017).
 Neubauer, Adolf. "Jews in China." The Jewish Quarterly Review 8.1 (1895): 123-139. online
 Paper, Jordan. The Theology of the Kaifeng Jews, 1000–1850 (Wilfrid Laurier UP, 2012)  
 Perlmann, S. M. The History of the Jews in China (R. Mazin, 1913) online.
 Pollack, Michael. Mandarins, Jews, and Missionaries:  the Jewish experience in the Chinese Empire, (New York:  Weatherhill, 1998), .
 Wald, Shalom Salomon. China and the Jewish People (2004)
 White, William Charles. Chinese Jews, (2nd ed, Paragon, 1966).
 Xu, Xin. The Jews of Kaifeng, China: History, Culture, and Religion (2003). online
 Xun, Zhou. Chinese Perceptions of the Jews' and Judaism: A History of the Youtai (Routledge, 2013).
 Zane, Nicholas. Jews in China: A History of Struggle (2019) excerpt

Historiography and Memory
 Goldstein, Jonathan, and Benjamin I. Schwartz. The Jews of China: v. 1: Historical and Comparative Perspectives (Routledge, 2015).
 Goldstein, Jonathan. The Jews of China: v. 2: A Sourcebook and Research Guide (Routledge, 2018) online
 Raiskin, Shlomy. "A Bibliography on Chinese Jewry", Moreshet Israel (Journal of Judaism, Zionism and Eretz-Israel), No. 3 (September 2006), pp. 60–85.
 Ross, James R. et al. eds. The Image of Jews in Contemporary China (2019) excerpt
 Shapiro, Sidney.  Jews in Old China, Studies by Chinese Scholars, (Hippocrene Books, 1984), online
 Shulman, Frank Joseph. "The Chinese Jews and the Jewish Diasporas in China from the Tang Period (AD 618-906) through the Mid-1990s: A Selected Bibliography." The Jews of China (Routledge, 2018) pp. 157–183.
 Song, Lihong. "From 'Jews in China' to 'Jews and China'." Journal of Modern Jewish Studies 17.4 (2018): 487-495.

External links
Schnorientalism: The Tao of Jews,  The Jewish Forward

 
Ethnic groups in China